The 56th parallel north is a circle of latitude that is 56 degrees north of the Earth's equatorial plane. It crosses Europe, Asia, the Pacific Ocean, North America, and the Atlantic Ocean.

At this latitude the sun is visible for 17 hours, 37 minutes during the summer solstice and 6 hours, 57 minutes during the winter solstice.

Around the world
Starting at the Prime Meridian and heading eastwards, the parallel 56° north passes through:

{| class="wikitable plainrowheaders"
! scope="col" width="125" | Co-ordinates
! scope="col" | Country, territory or sea
! scope="col" | Notes
|-
| style="background:#b0e0e6;" | 
! scope="row" style="background:#b0e0e6;" | North Sea
| style="background:#b0e0e6;" |
|-
| 
! scope="row" | 
| Jutland (mainland)
|-
| style="background:#b0e0e6;" | 
! scope="row" style="background:#b0e0e6;" | Kattegat
| style="background:#b0e0e6;" |
|-
| 
! scope="row" | 
| Island of Samsø, passing through the northern tip for about 400 meters
|-
| style="background:#b0e0e6;" | 
! scope="row" style="background:#b0e0e6;" | Kattegat
| style="background:#b0e0e6;" |
|-
| 
! scope="row" | 
| Island of Sjælland, passing just south of Helsingør
|-
| style="background:#b0e0e6;" | 
! scope="row" style="background:#b0e0e6;" | Øresund
| style="background:#b0e0e6;" |
|-
| 
! scope="row" | 
| Scania, passing just south of Helsingborg
|-
| style="background:#b0e0e6;" | 
! scope="row" style="background:#b0e0e6;" | Hanöbukten
| style="background:#b0e0e6;" |
|-
| 
! scope="row" | 
| Blekinge
|-
| style="background:#b0e0e6;" | 
! scope="row" style="background:#b0e0e6;" | Baltic Sea
| style="background:#b0e0e6;" |
|-
| 
! scope="row" | 
| Klaipėda County
|-
| 
! scope="row" | 
| Passing just north of Daugavpils
|-
| 
! scope="row" | 
| Vitebsk Region
|-
| 
! scope="row" | 
| For about 13 km
|-
| 
! scope="row" | 
| For about 17 km
|-
| 
! scope="row" | 
| Passing just north of Moscow
|-
| style="background:#b0e0e6;" | 
! scope="row" style="background:#b0e0e6;" | Sea of Okhotsk
| style="background:#b0e0e6;" |
|-
| 
! scope="row" |  
| Kamchatka Peninsula
|-
| style="background:#b0e0e6;" | 
! scope="row" style="background:#b0e0e6;" | Bering Sea
| style="background:#b0e0e6;" |
|-
| 
! scope="row" | 
| Alaska - the Alaska Peninsula
|-valign="top"
| style="background:#b0e0e6;" | 
! scope="row" style="background:#b0e0e6;" | Pacific Ocean
| style="background:#b0e0e6;" | Gulf of Alaska - passing just south of the Semidi Islands, and just north of Chirikof Island, Alaska,  Passing just south of Kuiu Island, Alaska, 
|-valign="top"
| 
! scope="row" | 
| Alaska - Kosciusko Island, Prince of Wales Island, Etolin Island and the Alaska Panhandle
|-valign="top"
| 
! scope="row" | 
| British Columbia - passing 2.5 km south of Hudson's Hope Alberta Saskatchewan Manitoba Ontario - passing just north of Fort Severn
|-
| style="background:#b0e0e6;" | 
! scope="row" style="background:#b0e0e6;" | Hudson Bay
| style="background:#b0e0e6;" |
|-
| 
! scope="row" | 
| Nunavut - Flaherty Island and Innetalling Island
|-
| style="background:#b0e0e6;" | 
! scope="row" style="background:#b0e0e6;" | Hudson Bay
| style="background:#b0e0e6;" |
|-valign="top"
| 
! scope="row" | 
| Quebec Newfoundland and Labrador
|-
| style="background:#b0e0e6;" | 
! scope="row" style="background:#b0e0e6;" | Atlantic Ocean
| style="background:#b0e0e6;" |
|-
| 
! scope="row" | 
| Scotland - Island of Jura
|-
| style="background:#b0e0e6;" | 
! scope="row" style="background:#b0e0e6;" | Sound of Jura
| style="background:#b0e0e6;" |
|-
| 
! scope="row" | 
| Scotland, passing through Helensburgh and then Falkirk town centre
|-
| style="background:#b0e0e6;" | 
! scope="row" style="background:#b0e0e6;" | Firth of Forth
| style="background:#b0e0e6;" | Passing through the Forth Bridge, and just north of Edinburgh
|-
| 
! scope="row" | 
| Scotland, passing through Dunbar
|-
| style="background:#b0e0e6;" | 
! scope="row" style="background:#b0e0e6;" | North Sea
| style="background:#b0e0e6;" |
|}

See also
55th parallel north
57th parallel north

References

n56